Punjabian Da King is a 2015 Punjabi Action Drama film directed by Manduip Singh, produced by Surender Singh and starring Navraj Hans, Keeya khanna, Bhanu Sri Mehra, Jarnail Singh, Shivendra Mahal, Bhottu Shah, Hobby Dhalliwal, and Bunny.

Cast
 Navraj Hans 
 Keeya Khanna
 Bhanu Sri Mehra 
 Jarnail Singh
 Shashi Kiran 
 Bhottu Shah 
 Shivendra Mahal 
 Hobby Dhaliwal 
 Baninder Bunny

References

External links
 

2015 films
Punjabi-language Indian films
2010s Punjabi-language films